BiPhePhos is an organophosphorus compound that is used as a ligand in homogeneous catalysis.  Classified as a diphosphite, BiPhePhos is derived from three 2,2'-biphenol groups, which constrain its shape in such a way to confer high selectivity to derived catalysts.  Originally described by workers at Union Carbide, it has become a standard ligand in hydroformylation.

See also
2,2'-Biphenylene phosphorochloridite (C12H8O2PCl) precursor to BiPhePhos.

References

Chelating agents
Organophosphites